is a fictional character and the main protagonist of the Nintendo DS video game Ghost Trick: Phantom Detective. Beginning the game as a ghost with amnesia, he must figure out what caused his death before the dawn breaks and his soul dissolves forever, solely by using his poltergeist-like ability to move objects. He was praised by critics for being a well-written and relatable character.

Appearances
Sissel's first appearance was in the video game Ghost Trick: Phantom Detective, where he is an amnesiac ghost who is attempting to recover his memories. Initially, he sees a woman being held at gunpoint by an assassin, with the corpse of a man in red in between them, which Sissel deduces to be his own. While the woman is moments from being shot, he is met by a fellow ghost who inhabits a lamp, nicknaming himself as "Ray of light," who convinces Sissel to help her, saying that it will help him recover his memories. Ray teaches him how to use his "ghost tricks," which include the ability to manipulate objects as well as the ability to rewind time to four minutes before a person's death to reverse it. Additionally, Ray warns Sissel that his soul will disappear by dawn. He winds up saving the girl and killing the man, learning that the girl's name is Lynne. He learns that she is investigating something significant, and teams up with her, with Sissel trusting her due to her honesty. Throughout the game, Sissel saves several people, including a girl named Kamila who was tied up, a dog named Missile who was shot, and Lynne, who dies several times. Sissel eventually learns that Lynne was apparently the one who killed him.

After agreeing to help Lynne delay the execution of a man named Jowd, Sissel travels to a prison in order to somehow stop it. He eventually manages this by destroying the electric chair that was to be used for Jowd, though in the process, he learns that his own face had been painted by Jowd while in prison. Sissel then has to rescue Kamila, the daughter of Jowd, who was kidnapped to force the justice minister to not cancel the execution. While attempting to rescue her from her kidnapper, he learns that she had died at some point, and was saved by Missile who also died yet again. At this point, Sissel and Missile work together on several occasions to save people, with Missile able to swap objects of the same shape. Sissel discovers eventually that his corpse has been moving around, making Sissel question whether he is this person. 

He also discovers that this man was involved in the case 10 years ago, where he held Lynne hostage. While Jowd claims to be responsible for his death back then, he was actually hit by a meteor fragment from the Temsik meteorite, making him effectively immortal. Sissel, Missile, and Lynne go to a submarine housing the people who arranged the assassination of Lynne, among everyone else who was involved in the event 10 years ago. The man who used Sissel's apparent body possessed the kidnapped Kamila and attempts to kill Lynne, but is unsuccessful. After realizing he had been betrayed and left behind in a sinking submarine after his body was taken by the assassins, he helps Sissel and Missile rescue Lynne and Kamila, and reveals his name to be Yomiel.

Sissel, Missile, and Yomiel travel back to 10 years ago after realizing that since Yomiel's body was only truly dead when he lost the meteorite, they could still save him. Through various manipulations, the three of them work together to prevent the meteorite piece from entering Yomiel's body, though Yomiel is forced to possess his own unconscious body to rescue Lynne, injuring himself. At this point, Yomiel reveals to Sissel the latter's true identity - that he was actually a cat that was at both the event of 10 years ago and the event at the beginning of the night. Ten years ago, when Yomiel discovered the abilities given to him by the meteorite, he took care of Sissel, keeping him up until the events of the beginning of the game. Yomiel possessed Lynne and had her shoot his body, though Lynne fought against this possession and missed in the first shot. However, Sissel died as a result of this bullet, when Lynne accidentally shot Sissel through the suitcase that Yomiel was carrying him in. He also learns that Ray was actually Missile from an alternate timeline, where he went back 10 years into the past and waited until someone could help him save Lynne and Kamila. In the end, changing the past caused all of the events to become undone, with only the ones present at Yomiel's fate change - namely Yomiel (who has just finished serving jail time), Missile, Jowd, and Sissel (who becomes Jowd's and Kamila's pet cat) - retaining their memories. Sissel also retains his abilities in the end.

He would later appear as an alternate costume color swap for Phoenix Wright in Ultimate Marvel vs. Capcom 3, and in the licensed webcomic The Adventures of Dr. McNinja.

Concept and creation
Sissel was designed by Shu Takumi, who also designed the game Ghost Trick: Phantom Detective, which he stars in. He is tall and lithe, with light skin and blonde hair. His attire consists of black sunglasses, red pants, a red jacket, a black undershirt, a white tie, a white belt, and a white pair of shoes. Sissel was made a ghost due to Takumi's desire to make a game where the protagonist could interact more and have control over other characters. "Unlike a human," Takumi says, "a ghost can interact with everything around him." Takumi specifically designed Sissel to not have the ability to possess humans because it would be "uninteresting"; instead, he gave Sissel the ability to control objects, since it would be too simple to be able to control humans directly. He adds that with this ability, Sissel could see the "mysteries, lives, puzzles, and challenges" of characters.  Because Ghost Trick: Phantom Detective focuses on attempting to recover Sissel's memory, every aspect of the character is designed to be a secret to players. Before they decided to make him a detective, the game was titled "Ghost Spy", where he acted in the capacity of a spy.

He shares a similarity in design to Phoenix Wright: Ace Attorney protagonist Phoenix Wright, with GamesRadar citing his "snappy dress sense and angled haircut." Takumi cites this as being due to his belief that a character is more interesting if they can make a good silhouette. Takumi designed Sissel with the intention of having a "lasting impact", citing the striking colours of his design. Sissel, like other protagonists designed by Takumi, is designed to be identifiable, which is accomplished by having him think what the player is thinking. He adds that when designing characters, he likes to put a bit of himself in them. Sissel was given sunglasses in order to make him seem mysterious, and signifying his amnesia.

Reception
Since appearing in Ghost Trick, Sissel has received generally positive reception. Eurogamer noted the similarity between Sissel and other video game characters due to his amnesia. In spite of this, Game Informers Joe Juba criticized him as "falling flat as a hero", specifically criticizing the game for using his amnesia as a "constant crutch." However, The Telegraph praised Ghost Trick for making players connect with Sissel due to how well-designed his amnesia was, describing it as more than a "tired narrative crutch", and added that this results in Sissel becoming more enduring. Game Revolution noted that without the interaction between Sissel and the other characters, the animation would not be enough to carry the game for him. He did, however, criticize Sissel for being "lame and lacking in personality at times". Adventure Gamers commented that in spite of his amnesia, he is "visually striking in his bright red suit and sunglasses, with hair swept back to form a single huge blonde spike." He added that he has a complex personality, and without a good writer, he and other characters could have been solely defined by the "exaggerated traits" found in their design. Video Gamer compared Sissel's design to that of Jedward's, an Irish pop rap duo consisting of identical twins. He additionally gave note to designer Shu Takumi for making an amnesiac character more interesting than others in the video game medium. The A.V. Club described his appearance as resembling a 1980s-era Tom Cruise.

Notes

References

Adventure game characters
Capcom protagonists
Fictional cats
Fictional characters with amnesia
Fictional ghosts
Fictional detectives
Ghost characters in video games
Ghost Trick: Phantom Detective
Male characters in video games
Telepath characters in video games
Video game characters introduced in 2010